The movement to reform sex offender laws in the United States describes the efforts of individuals and organizations to change state laws requiring Sex offender registries in the United States. Efforts fall into two main categories, advocacy for reform of statutory rape laws that may require a teenager to register as a sex offender for consensual sexual acts involving a younger teen, and broader efforts to modify sex offender registration laws based upon their sometimes dramatic impact on a convicted sex offender and belief that they provide little benefit for public safety.

The reform movement involves more than 50 state level organizations, with at least one group operating in each state. The movement includes Human Rights Watch, the ACLU and some of its state-level affiliates, and some child safety advocates, some of whom argue for restrictions on who may be placed upon a list of registered sex offenders, and when the public should have access to sex offender registries.

Arguments

The participants in the movement argue that indiscriminate placement of offenders in the sex offender registry may undermine their ability to rehabilitate because of the social stigma and other hardship related to sex offender registration. They assert that sex offender registries are overly broad as they reach to non-violent offenses, such as sexting or consensual teen sex and target people who are not sexual predators but who have rather made a mistake, and keep unfairly punishing the offender even decades after serving their sentences.

They say that registries should be available for law enforcement only and that officials should be more judicious in deciding who poses a risk instead of the current policies applied to all offenders indiscriminately, as every case and defendant's story is different. The movement points to lack of evidence to support effectiveness of sex offender registries or residency restrictions, and notes that collateral consequences of sex offender registration, such as social stigma, unemployment, homelessness and vigilante attacks extend also to the families of registrants.

Vigilantism against registered sex offenders
A primary argument for the reform of sex offender laws is that sex offender registration inherently encourages vigilante action by those who use sex offender lists to locate, harass, attack, and even murder registered sex offenders.  Due to widespread access to the Internet, many sex offender lists are easily located by those wishing to intimidate or otherwise harm registered offenders.  Even though law enforcement officials strongly condemn using the sex offender registries for the purposes of harm and harassment, dozens of recorded cases occur each year of crimes against registered offenders.

Documented abuses of the registered sex offender list include:

 Repeated and false reports to police regarding sex offenders living in a residential area
 Posting public signs drawing attention to a registered offender's address or otherwise advertising to others where the registered offender lives
 Verbal threats either in person or through the phone or e-mail
 Repeated acts of trespassing or deliberately damaging property belonging to the registered sex offender
 Physical assault 
 Murder

Among the most serious crimes against registered offenders include the case of Patrick Drum, who shot and killed two men in 2012 because they were listed on the state of Washington's sex offender registry.  Jeremy and Christine Moody, two self professed neo-Nazis, were convicted in 2014 of kidnapping and murder when they forced a registered sex offender and his wife into their home at gunpoint and then executed them. Stephen Marshall, after killing two registered offenders in Maine, committed suicide when he was cornered on a bus by police.

Activism
Movements activism consist of peaceful demonstrations, challenging the laws in courts and educating the public and legislators about facts of sexual offending and the consequences of current legislation. The National Association for Rational Sexual Offense Laws arranges yearly national conferences to discuss sex offender legislation, and makes its presence known at conferences of the National Association of Criminal Defense Lawyers. Their state affiliates have challenged ordinances governing sex offenders in federal court. During 2014 over 20 municipalities in California were sued by RSOL. Their efforts in California culminated, in March 2015, when Supreme Court of California declared residency restrictions unconstitutional citing their unfairness and counterproductive effects. Similar lawsuits by the activists have forced some Texas towns to ease their residency restrictions.

In April 2015 Women Against Registry announced that it has begun gathering information and participants for two class action lawsuits to be filed in United States federal court. One of the lawsuits is intended to be on behalf of registered sex offenders, and the second on behalf of families of registered sex offenders. In 2016 Alliance for Constitutional Sex Offense Laws sued the government for the unique identifier planned to be printed on passports of some registrants.

See also
Alliance for Constitutional Sex Offense Laws
Arkansas Time After Time
Florida Action Committee
National Association for Rational Sexual Offense Laws
USA FAIR, Inc.
Illinois Voices for Reform
Michigan Citizens for Justice
Women Against Registry
Nebraskans Unafraid

References

Criminal justice reform in the United States
Law reform in the United States
Sex offender registries in the United States